The Little Pee Dee River is a  tributary of the Pee Dee River (which originates in the Appalachian Mountains where it is known as the Yadkin River). The Little Pee Dee technically arises near Laurinburg, North Carolina as Gum Swamp, which flows southward, receiving several small tributaries, across the South Carolina border into Red Bluff Lake, near McColl, South Carolina. The Little Pee Dee River is named after the Pee Dee Indian Tribe. In fact, today the tribe still occupies some of their ancestral lands, although the tribe only consists of just over 200 enrolled members.

It is navigable only by canoe or other small craft. Some parts of the Little Pee Dee River are nearly blocked by low-hanging tree branches. It is bordered by a swamp area that features bald cypress, sweetgum, oak, tupelo and other hardwoods. It flows southeastward, roughly paralleling the state border until it receives the somewhat larger Lumber River (a National Wild and Scenic River) near Nichols, South Carolina, from which the much larger river flows more nearly southward until it joins with the Pee Dee near Yauhannah, South Carolina.

Part of the lower section has been designated a Scenic River by the South Carolina Department of Natural Resources. It features deep channels, slow moving water, and white sandy bars and beaches. Cooters, sunning on logs, are a common sight. Other wildlife is abundant, including alligators, beavers, deer, and wood ducks. Less common species like bald eagles, pileated woodpeckers, and prothonotary warblers, can be spotted with a little luck. The river also offers excellent fishing. A Boating Guide to the Little Pee Dee is available from the South Carolina Department of Natural Resources.  It covers the history of the river, its flora and fauna as well as a listing of access points and boating information. Paddle SC has list of 10 suggested trips on the Little Pee Dee listing difficulty and current runnability.

The Little Pee Dee runs its entire length through coastal lands of low relief that are pockmarked with Carolina bays. Down river from Dillon, South Carolina is Little Pee Dee State Park. Adjacent to this is the Little Pee Dee Heritage Preserve which is a Carolina bay that has been preserved as natural as possible.

References

External links 
 Little Pee Dee State Park and Little Pee Dee Bay Heritage Preserve
 Boating Guide to the Little Pee Dee
 Ten Trips on the Little Pee Dee

Rivers of South Carolina
Rivers of North Carolina
Tributaries of the Pee Dee River
Rivers of Scotland County, North Carolina
Rivers of Marlboro County, South Carolina
Rivers of Marion County, South Carolina